The Bell 360 Invictus is a proposed helicopter design intended to meet the United States Army requirement for a Future Attack Reconnaissance Aircraft (FARA). It is based on technology from the Bell 525 Relentless.

Design and development
Scott C. Donnelly, CEO of Textron, has said in April 2019 that the 360 will be based on the 525. The 360 and 525 will share an articulated rotor system, although the 360, which will only seat two (a pilot and gunner), will use a single engine and a four-blade rotor, whereas the 525 uses twin engines and a five-blade rotor and has a nineteen-passenger capacity. Bell has since announced it is developing the 360 with Collins Aerospace, and the Sierra Nevada Corporation is developing the mission system for the aircraft.

The design was unveiled on 1 October 2019, showing a two-seat tandem cockpit, with sighting optics and/or laser designator above a 20mm cannon gun turret at the chin position below the cockpit, mid-mounted stub wings below the shrouded rotor hub and four  diameter rotor blades, an active horizontal stabilizer and a tilted and shrouded tail rotor. Missiles are mounted on integrated launchers. The rotor diameter is dictated by US Army requirements, which specified that maximum diameter for FARA candidates to allow the rotorcraft to fit between buildings on future battlefields. Its main engine will be a single General Electric T901 turboshaft engine, with supplemental power from a Pratt & Whitney PW207D1 turboshaft.

The stub wings are intended to provide lift equivalent to approximately 50% of the weight of the aircraft at moderate to high speed. Combat radius will be  with at least 90 minutes time on station. It will use fly-by-wire control.

Bell unveiled a full-scale mockup of the 360 at the Association of the United States Army annual show beginning 14 October 2019.

Specifications (Bell 360)

See also

References

External links

Bell aircraft
Single-turbine helicopters
United States military helicopters
Fantail helicopters
2020s United States helicopters
2020s United States attack aircraft